The 2011–12 Argentine Primera D Metropolitana was the season of fifth division professional of football in Argentina. A total of 18 teams competed; the champion was promoted to Primera C Metropolitana.

Club information

Table

Standings

Torneo Reducido

Relegation

See also
2011–12 in Argentine football

References

External links
List of Argentine second division champions by RSSSF

5
Primera D seasons